Clathrus kusanoi is a species of fungus in the stinkhorn family. It is known only from Japan.

References

Phallales
Fungi of Asia